Haiku Studios was a video game developer based in France, founded by Olivier Cordoleani and Hervé Lange in 1993. Cordoleani and Lange both worked on Iron and Flame (Atari), B.A.T. (1990, Ubisoft) and B.A.T. II - The Koshan Conspiracy (1992, Ubisoft) under the name Computer's Dream during the 1980s. The name Haiku Studios was coined in 1993 and consisted of Computer's Dream and several other developers.
 
The company developed Down in the Dumps, which was published by Philips Media for MS-DOS, Microsoft Windows and Apple Macintosh in 1996. A 3D racing game, Demon Driver; "Moreau", (believed to be a tie-in to the 1996 movie The Island of Dr. Moreau starring Marlon Brando and Val Kilmer) and Elric the Necromancer, an action RPG in the Diablo ilk, were in development when the company went out of business in 1997.

References

External links
 
 Alone in the Past? Interview with Olivier Cordoleani (French)

Defunct video game companies of France
Video game companies established in 1993
Video game companies disestablished in 1997